Chinoy is the surname of the following people
Helen Krich Chinoy (1922–2010), American theater historian
Sharmeen Obaid-Chinoy (born 1978), Pakistani journalist and filmmaker
Sujan R. Chinoy, Indian diplomat
Usha Chinoy (1929–2004), Indian educationist and musician 
 Alisha Chinoy, Indian Singer